The State Council of the Chuvash Republic is the regional parliament of Chuvashia, a federal subject of Russia. It consists of 44 deputies elected for five-year terms.

The presiding officer is the chairman.

Elections

2016

2021

See also
List of chairpersons of the State Council of the Chuvash Republic

References

Sources
Administrative structure of the republic

Chuvashia
Politics of Chuvashia
Chuvash